Weapons that saw use in WWII

Albania

Sidearms

 Bodeo Model 1889
 Beretta M1934
 Luger P08
 Mauser C96
 Walther P38

Submachine guns

 Beretta M1918
 Beretta Model 38
 MP 40

Rifles

 Carcano
 Gewehr 98
 Karabiner 98k
 Mauser Model 1893
 Lee–Enfield
 Pattern 1914 Enfield
 Steyr-Mannlicher M1895
 Mannlicher-Schönauer
 Mosin–Nagant

Machine guns

 Breda 30
 Breda M37
 Schwarzlose machine gun
 Fiat–Revelli Modello 1914
 PM M1910
 MG 34
 MG 42

Australia

Sidearms

 Browning Hi-Power
 Enfield No.2
 Smith & Wesson Victory
 Webley Mk.VI (.455)

Submachine guns

 Thompson M1928A1
 Sten submachine gun
 Austen submachine gun
 Owen submachine gun

Rifles

 Lee–Enfield No.1 Mk III* and No.4 Mk I* (Standard issue rifle)
 Jungle Carbine
 Charlton automatic rifle

Machine guns

 Lewis machine gun
 Bren machine gun
 Vickers machine gun

Flamethrowers

 M2 flamethrower
 Flamethrower, Portable, No 2

Mortars

 Stokes mortar
 Ordnance SBML 2-inch mortar
 Ordnance ML 3-inch mortar

Anti-tank weapons

 PIAT
 Boys anti-tank rifle

Austria

Sidearms

 Smith & Wesson Model 10
 Roth–Steyr M1907
 Steyr M1912
 Dreyse M1907
 Luger P08
 Mauser C96
 Walther P38

Submachine guns

 MP 34
 MP 40

Rifles

 Steyr-Mannlicher M1895

Machine guns

 Schwarzlose M1907/12
 MG 30
 MG 34
 MG 42

Belgium

Edged weapons

 M1924 bayonet

Sidearms

 Browning Hi-Power
 Browning FN M1910 and M1922
 Nagant M1895

Submachine guns

 Sten submachine gun
 MP 18
 MP 28

Rifles

 Belgian Mauser M1935 (Standard issue rifle)
 Lee–Enfield No.4 Mk I
 Mosin–Nagant M1891/30
 Mauser Gewehr 98
 Mauser M1889

Light machine guns

 Lewis machine gun
 Browning M1918
 Browning FN M1930
 MG 08/15

Medium machine guns

 Hotchkiss M1914
 Vickers machine gun

Heavy machine guns

 Browning M1917
 MG 08

Anti-tank weapons

 PIAT

Brazil

Sidearms

 M1917 revolver
 Browning Hi-Power
 Colt M1911 
 Luger P08

Submachine guns

 M3 submachine gun
 Reising M50
 Thompson submachine gun
 MP 18

Shotguns

 Browning Auto-5
 Winchester M1897
 Ithaca 37

Rifles

 M1 carbine
 Springfield M1903
 FN M1924
 Vz. 24
 Vz. 33
 Mauser M1908

Light machine guns

 Madsen machine gun
 Browning M1918
 Hotchkiss M1922

Medium machine guns

 Browning M1919
 Hotchkiss M1914

Heavy machine guns

 Browning M1917
 Browning M2
 MG 08

Grenades

 Mk.2 fragmentation hand grenade
 Molotov fire grenade

Flamethrowers

 M2 flamethrower

Anti-tank weapons

 M1 Bazooka
 M18 recoilless rifle

Bulgaria

Sidearms

 Luger P08 pistol
 Walther PP
 Tokarev TT-33

Submachine guns

 ZK-383
 MP 34
 MP 40
 PPSh-41
 PPS-43

Rifles

 Mosin–Nagant M1891/30
 Steyr-Mannlicher M1895
 Mauser Karabiner 98k

Machine guns

 Maxim M1910
 Bren machine gun
 Madsen machine gun
 Schwarzlose M1907/12
 MG 08
 MG 30
 MG 34
 Degtyaryov DP-28

Mortars

 Brandt M1927/31
 8 cm Granatwerfer 34

Anti-tank weapons

 Solothurn S-18/100
 Panzerschreck
 Panzerfaust

State of Burma

Sidearms

 Nambu pistol 
 Webley Revolver (Captured)

Submachine guns

 M1 Thompson (Captured)
 Sten (Captured)

Rifles

 Arisaka Type 30
 Arisaka Type 38
 Lee-Enfield (Captured)

Machine guns

 Bren LMG (Captured)
 Lewis gun (Captured)
 Vickers machine gun (Captured)
 Type 3 heavy machine gun
 Type 11 light machine gun

Canada

Sidearms

 Browning Hi-Power
 Webley revolver
 Enfield No.2
 Colt M1907 Police Positive
 Colt M1911
 Smith & Wesson Victory
 Smith & Wesson Triple Lock

Submachine guns

 Sten submachine gun (Locally produced)
 Thompson submachine gun 
 Lanchester submachine gun
 Reising M50

Rifles

 Lee–Enfield No.3 and No.4 Mk I (Locally produced, Standard issue rifle)
 Ross rifle
 M1 carbine
 M1 Garand (Garands were issued to certain Canadian Army units near the end of World War II)
 Enfield M1917

Machine guns

 Bren machine gun (Standard issue LMG)
 Lewis machine gun
 Browning M1917
 Browning M1918
 Browning M1919
 Johnson M1941 machine gun
 Vickers machine gun

Grenades

 Mk.2 fragmentation hand grenade
 No.36M grenade (also known as the "Mills bomb")
 No. 68 AT grenade

Flamethrowers

 Flamethrower, Portable, No 2 "Ack Pack"

Anti-tank weapons

 M1 Bazooka
 PIAT
 Boys anti tank rifle (Locally produced)

China

Weapons used by the National Revolutionary Army, as well as Communist forces and Chinese warlords

Edged weapons

 Type 30 bayonet (Captured)
 HY1935 bayonet
 Qiang spear
 Dadao sword
 Miao dao sword

Sidearms

 M1917 revolver (American Lend-Lease)
 Browning Hi-Power (Limited numbers in the Burma Campaign X-Forces and Y-Forces)
 Browning FN M1900 (Imported and locally produced)
 Browning FN M1922
 Colt M1903 Pocket Hammerless (Issued to officers only)
 Colt M1911A1 (American Lend-Lease)
 Astra 900
 Nagant M1895
 Nambu Type 14 (Captured)
 Type 26 revolver (Captured)
 Mauser C96 (Locally produced)
 Mauser M712

Submachine guns

 M3A1 submachine gun (Lend-Leased to the National Revolutionary Army, along with the Thompson, to replace the outdated Chinese copies of the MP 18 and MP 28 submachine guns used during the Second Sino-Japanese War and the early years of the Chinese Civil War)
 Thompson submachine gun (American Lend-Lease and local production)
 United Defense M42 (American Lend-Lease and local production)
 Sten submachine gun
 Erma EMP-35 (Limited)
 SIG M1920 (Locally produced copy with a downward facing magazine known as the Tsing Dao Submachine Gun) 
 MP 34
 PPD-40

Rifles

 M1 Carbine (American Lend-Lease)
 Enfield M1917 (American Lend-Lease)
 Springfield M1903 (American Lend-Lease)
 Lee–Enfield No.4 Mk I (American Lend-Lease, used in training in Burma)
 Carcano rifle
 FN M1924
 Mosin–Nagant M1891 and M1891/30
 Arisaka rifle (Captured)
 Vz. 24
 ZH-29
 Hanyang Type 88 (Standard issue rifle)
 Type 1 rifle
 Mauser Gewehr 98
 Type 24 rifle (Licensed copy of the Mauser Model 1924, also known as the Chiang Kai-Shek rifle)
 Mauser Karabiner 98k (Mainly issued to the early German trained divisions)

Light machine guns

 Lewis machine gun
 Hotchkiss M1922
 Bren machine gun (Both in .303 and 7.92 Mauser)
 MAC M1924/29 light machine gun
 Type 11 light machine gun (Captured)
 Type 96 light machine gun (Captured)
 Madsen machine gun
 Lahti-Saloranta M26 (Very limited numbers)
 SIG KE7
 ZB vz.26 (Imported from Czechoslovakia and locally produced)
 Degtyaryov DP-28

Medium machine guns

 Browning M1919 (American Lend-Lease in Burma)
 Hotchkiss M1914

Heavy machine guns

 PM M1910
 Browning M1917 (American Lend-Lease and locally produced)
 Type 3 heavy machine gun (Captured)
 Type 24 machine gun

Grenades

 Type 23 grenade
 Chinese Stielhandgranate

Flamethrowers

 M1A1 flamethrower

Anti-tank weapons

 M1 Bazooka
 Boys anti tank rifle

Independent State of Croatia

Edged weapons

 Kampfmesser 42 (Bayonet)
 Seitengewehr 98 (Bayonet)

Sidearms

 Luger pistol
 Nagant M1895
 M1910/22
 Walther P38

Submachine guns

 Suomi KP/-31
 Erma EMP-35
 MP 34
 MP 40
 PPSh-41 (Captured)

Automatic rifles

 Sturmgewehr 44

Rifles

 Berthier rifle
 Carcano rifle
 vz. 24
 Mauser Karabiner 98k
 Mannlicher M1895
 Lebel Model 1886 rifle
 M1924

Machine guns

 Chauchat
 Fiat-Revelli M1914
 MG 34
 MG 42
 Lewis gun
 PM M1910
 M26
 M37
 M1909
 Hotchkiss M1914

Grenades

 Nebelhandgranate 39
 M1924 Stielhandgranate

Mortars

 Stokes mortar (60 mm)
 Brandt M1927/31 (81 mm)
 8 cm Granatwerfer 34
 12 cm Granatwerfer 42

Anti-tank weapons

 Panzerschreck
 Panzerfaust

Czechoslovakia

Sidearms

 ČZ vz. 27
 ČZ vz. 38
 Pistole vz. 22
 Pistole vz. 24

Submachine guns

 Sten submachine gun
 ZK-383
 MP 40

Rifles

 Lee–Enfield rifle
 Steyr Mannlicher M1895
 vz. 24
 vz. 33
 ZH-29

Machine guns

 ZB vz. 26
 ZB vz. 30
 ZB-50
 ZB-53

Denmark

Sidearms

 Smith & Wesson Model 10
 Danish M1880/85 Army revolver
 Bergmann–Bayard M1910

Submachine guns

 Sten submachine gun (Used by the Danish resistance movement)
 Lettet-Forsøgs submachine gun

Shotguns

 Sjögren shotgun (Limited numbers)

Rifles

 Lee–Enfield rifle
 Krag–Jørgensen M1889
 Mauser Karabiner 98k
 Swedish Mauser M96
 Automatgevar M42

Machine guns

 Browning M1919
 M29 medium machine gun (Heavy barrel version of the standard M24)
 Madsen machine gun

Anti-tank weapons

 Madsen 20 mm anti-tank cannon
 37 mm Fodfolkskanon M1937 (Danish Bofors 37 mm)

Egypt

Sidearms

 Colt Model 1903 Pocket Hammerless
 Colt M1911
 Mauser C96
 Rast & Gasser M1898
 Webley Revolver

Submachine guns

 M1 Thompson
 MP 18
 Sten

Rifles

 Gewehr 88
 Mannlicher M1895
 Lee-Enfield
 Lee-Metford
 Pattern 1914 Enfield

Machine guns

 Bren light machine gun
 Madsen machine gun 
 MG 08
 Maxim gun
 Lewis gun
 Schwarzlose machine gun

Estonia

Sidearms

 Browning Hi-Power
 Nagant M1895

Submachine guns

 Suomi KP/-31
 Tallinn Arsenal submachine gun

Rifles

 Mosin–Nagant rifle
 vz. 24

Machine guns

 Lewis gun
 Maxim M1910 
 Madsen machine gun

Anti-tank weapons

 Solothurn S-18/1100

Ethiopia

Sidearms

 Beretta M1934(Captured)
 FN Model 1910
 Nagant M1895
 Webley Revolver

Submachine guns

 Beretta Model 38 (Captured)
 Sten

Rifles

 Carcano (Captured) 
 Lee–Enfield rifle
 Mosin–Nagant rifle

Machine guns

 Breda 30 (Captured)
 Bren LMG
 Maxim M1910 
 Lewis gun
 Vickers machine gun
 ZB vz. 26

Finland

Edged weapons

 Puukko knife

Sidearms

 Browning Hi-Power
 Browning FN M1903
 Browning FN M1910 (Used by the Home Guard)
 Browning FN M1922
 Colt M1911 (Captured)
 Smith & Wesson Model 10
 Beretta M1915 and M1915/19
 Beretta M1934
 Beretta M1935 (Used by the Home Guard)
 Ruby M1914
 Nagant M1895 (Captured)
 Lahti L-35
 Pistole vz. 24
 Pistole vz. 38
 Luger pistol (Used by Finnish officers)
 Mauser C96 (614 examples)
 Walther P38 (P1 variant, Finnish peacekeeping forces)
 Tokarev TT-33 (Captured)

Submachine guns

 Suomi KP/-31
 KP m/44 submachine gun
 Sten submachine gun (Captured)
 MP 28 (Other variants made in Finland and Switzerland)
 MP 40 (Delivered with German vehicles)
 PPD-40 (Captured)
 PPSh-41 (Captured)
 PPS-43 (Captured)

Rifles

 Finnish Mosin–Nagant M28-30 (Also known as the Pystykorva)
 Winchester M1895
 Lee–Enfield rifle
 Carcano rifle (Special variant with attachable rifle grenade)
 Mosin–Nagant M1939
 Mauser Gewehr 98
 Mauser Karabiner 98k
 Swedish Mauser M96 (Also known as Carl Gustav M96)

Automatic and battle rifles
AVS-36 (Captured)
AVT-40 (Captured)
Fedorov M1916 Avtomat (Captured)

Machine guns

 Lewis machine gun
 Maxim M1910
 Finnish Maxim M32-33
 Browning M1918
 Browning M1919
 Vickers machine gun
 Chauchat M1915 (Mainly used in the anti-aircraft role)
 Madsen machine gun (Used by Norwegian and Danish volunteers)
 Lahti-Saloranta M26
 ZB vz. 26
 MG 08
 MG 34 (Limited use)
 Kg M40 light machine gun (Used by Swedish volunteers)
 Degtyaryov DP-28 (Captured)
 Goryunov SG-43

Grenades

 M1924 Stielhandgranate
 Molotov fire grenade

Mines

 Panssarimiina m/36
 Panssarimiina m/39
 Panssarimiina m/S-39
 Panssarimiina m/44

Flamethrowers

 Lanciafiamme M1935
 Liekinheitin m/44

Anti-tank weapons

 Hotchkiss 25 mm anti-tank gun
 Boys anti-tank rifle (As 14 mm Pst Kiv/37)
 Madsen 20 mm anti-tank cannon
 Lahti L-39
 Solothurn S-18/100
 Panzerschreck
 Panzerfaust
 Bofors 37 mm (As 37 Pst K/36)

Anti-aircraft weapons

 20 ITK 35 (Breda M1935)
 Madsen 20 mm anti-aircraft cannon
 VKT 7,62 ITKK 31
 VKT 20 ITK 40

France

Edged weapons

 Coup Coup Machete (Used by Senegalese Tirailleurs)
 Fairbairn–Sykes fighting knife (Used by the French Resistance, Free French Forces Commandos.

Sidearms

 Star M1914
 Union pistol
 Savage M1907
 Smith & Wesson Model 10
 FP-45 Liberator (Supplied by the US for the French resistance)
 MAB D
 MAS M1873
 MAS M1892
 Ruby M1914
 SACM M1935A
 Luger P08 (Captured)

Submachine guns

 Thompson M1928 (American aid)
 Sten submachine gun (British aid)
 MAS-38
 Erma EMP-35
 MP 18
 MP 40 (French resistance)

Shotguns

 Winchester M1897
 Winchester M1912

Rifles

 Enfield M1917 (American aid)
 Springfield M1903 (American aid)
 Lee–Enfield No.4 Mk I (British aid)
 Berthier M1892/16 carbine
 Berthier M1907/15 rifle
 Lebel M1886/93
 MAS-36
 MAS-44 prototype
 MAS-40
 RSC M1917 and M1918 
 Mauser Karabiner 98k (French resistance)
 M1 Garand

Machine guns

 Lewis machine gun
 Browning M1918
 Browning M1919
 Hotchkiss M1914
 Hotchkiss M1922
 Bren machine gun
 Chauchat M1915
 Darne machine gun
 MAC M1924/29 light machine gun
 MAC M1931

Grenades

 F1 grenade
 OF 37 offensive grenade
 VB rifle grenade

Mortars

 Brandt 60.7 mm M1935
 Brandt 81 mm M1927/31
 Lance Grenades 50 mm M1937

Anti-tank weapons

 M1 Bazooka
 PIAT
 Boys anti-tank rifle

Guided explosive weapons

 Kegresse K (Cable guided explosive machine)

Nazi Germany

In addition to the weapons listed here, German armed forces also used a wide variety of weapons captured from defeated enemies.

Edged weapons

 Kampfmesser 42 (Bayonet)
 Seitengewehr 84/98 III (Bayonet)
 Seitengewehr 98 (Bayonet)

Sidearms
 Luger P08
 Mauser C96
 M712 Schnellfeuer (fully automatic variant
 Mauser HSC
 Reichsrevolver
 Sauer 38H
 Volkspistole
 Walther P38(standard-issued pistol of the German army)
 Walther PP and PPK

Foreign weapons produced under occupation

 Pistole 27(t) (ČZ vz. 27)
 Pistole 625(f) (SACM M1935A)
 Pistole 640(b) (Browning Hi-Power)
 Pistole 645(p) / P35(p) (FB Vis)
Pistole 657(n) (Kongsberg Colt)

Submachine guns
 MP 18 & MP 28
 Erma EMP-35
 MP 35
 MP 38
 MP 40 & MP 41
 MP 3008 (Gerät Neumünster) & Gerät Potsdam - copies of Sten
 Suomi KP/-31

Foreign weapons produced under occupation

 MP 722(f) (MAS-38)
 MP 738(i) / MP 739(i) (Beretta M1938)
 ZK-383

Combination guns

 M30 Luftwaffe drilling (Shotgun/rifle never used in combat, only as a survival firearm for Luftwaffe pilots who were shot down)

Automatic rifles and assault rifles

 Gewehr 41
 Gewehr 43
 Fallschirmjäger Gewehr 42 - paratrooper rifle
 Sturmgewehr 44
 Volkssturmgewehr - a series of last ditch weapons

Bolt action rifles

 Mauser Karabiner 98k
 Mauser Karabiner 98a
 Mauser Karabiner 98b
 Mauser Model 1871 (limited)
 Mauser Model 1889
 35M rifle
 GRC Gewehr 88 Obsolete, the Volkssturm
 Mauser Gewehr 98 Obsolete, used by Volkssturm
 Winchester M1895 Obsolete, used by Volkssturm

Foreign weapons produced under occupation

 Gewehr 24(t) (vz. 24)
 Gewehr 29/40(ö) (modified version of Karabinek wz. 1929, produced in Poland under Austrian management)
 Gewehr 33/40(t) (modified version of vz. 33)
 Gewehr 211(n) (Krag-Jørgensen)

Sniper rifles

 Gewehr 43 (Scoped)
 Mauser Gewehr 98 (Scoped)
 Mauser Karabiner 98k (Scoped)

Machine guns
 Bergmann MG 15nA machine gun used by volkssturm
 MG 08 (Limited)
 MG 13
 MG 15
 MG 34
 MG 42
 MG 35-36A "Knorr-Bremse"

Foreign weapons produced under occupation

 Maschinengewehr MG 26(t) (ZB vz.26)
 Maschinengewehr MG 30(t) (ZB vz. 30)
 Schweres Maschinengewehr 258(d) (Madsen machine gun)

Grenades & Grenade launchers
 Blendkörper 1H (smoke grenade)
 Blendkörper 2H (smoke grenade)
 Hafthohlladung (Also known as Panzerknacker)
 M1924 Stielhandgranate
 M1939 Eiergranate
 M1943 Stielhandgranate
 Splitterring (Fragmentation ring for the M1924 Stielhandgranate and the M1943 Stielhandgranate)
 Schiessbecher (Attached on Mauser Karabiner 98k carbine only)

Mine

 S-mine (Anti-personnel mine)

Flamethrowers

 Flammenwerfer 35
 Flammenwerfer 41
 Einstossflammenwerfer 46

Mortars

 5 cm leicht Granatwerfer 36
 8 cm Granatwerfer 34
 8 cm kurz Granatwerfer 42
 12 cm Granatwerfer 42

Anti-tank weapons

 Solothurn S-18/100
 Sturmpistole
 Panzerbüchse 38 and Panzerbüchse 39
 Panzerschreck (Approximately 290,000)
 Panzerfaust

Anti-aircraft rocket launcher

 Fliegerfaust - prototypes/trials only

Guided explosive weapons

 Leichtes Ladungsträger Sd.Kfz.302 "Goliath" (Electrical engined remote controlled explosive machine)
 Leichtes Ladungsträger Sd.Kfz.303A and B "Goliath" (Petrol engined remote controlled explosive machine)

Greece

Edged weapons

 Bayonet
 Improvised knife

Sidearms

 Browning FN M1910/22
 Colt M1927 Official Police
 Beretta M1934 (Captured from the Italians)
 Beretta M1935 (Captured from the Italians)
 Ruby M1914
 Nagant M1895
 Luger pistol (Captured from the Germans)
 Bergmann-Bayard M1908

Submachine guns

 M3 submachine gun (Used by exiled Greek forces)
 Thompson M1928 and M1A1 (Used by exiled Greek forces)
 Sten submachine gun (Used by exiled Greek forces)
 Beretta M1938 (Captured from the Italians)
 MP 34 (Captured from the Germans and used by gendarmerie and police forces)
 MP 40 (Captured from the Germans)

Rifles

 Mannlicher-Schönauer M1903, M1903/14, M1903/27 and M1903/30 (Standard issue rifle)
 Lee-Enfield rifle (Used by exiled Greek forces)
 Carcano rifle (Captured from the Italians)
 Lebel M1886/93
 Gras M1874 and M1874/14
 Berthier M1892, M1892/16, M1907/15 and M1916
 Mannlicher M1895
 Mauser FN M1930

Light machine guns

 Hotchkiss Μ1922/26
 Bren machine gun (Used by exiled Greek forces)
 Breda M1930 (Captured from the Italians)
 Chauchat M1915
 EPK M1939

Medium machine guns

 Hotchkiss M1914
 Hotchkiss modified machine gun
 Saint Étienne M1907/16

Heavy machine guns

 Schwarzlose M1907/12

Grenades

Mortars

 Brixia M1935 (Captured from the Italians)
 Brandt M1927/31

Anti-tank weapons

 PIAT

Hungary

Sidearms

 FÉG 29M
 FÉG 37M Pistol
 Frommer Stop
 Frommer Lilliput
 Rast & Gasser M1898
 Walther P38

Submachine guns

 Danuvia 39M and 43M
 Beretta M1938
 MP35
 MP40
 PPSh-41 (Captured)

Rifles

 30M rifle
 31M rifle
 35M rifle (Standard issue rifle)
 38M rifle
 95M Mannlicher
 Steyr-Mannlicher M1895

Machine guns

 Madsen light machine gun (Madsen golyószóró)
 Schwarzlose M1907/31M heavy machine gun
 Solothurn 31M light machine gun
 34M Stange (MG 34)
 MG 34
 42M Grunov (MG 42)
 42M (MG 131)
 Degtyaryov DP-28

Grenades

 31M Vesiczky
 36M Vécsey
 37M Demeter
 39A/M (Molotov fire grenade)
 42M Vecsey
 L-28M Goldmann
 Lila füstgyertya
 M1924 Stielhandgranate

Mines

 36M mine
 43M mine

Anti-tank weapons

 43M kézi páncéltörő vető (Hungarian bazooka variant)
 Solothurn 36M 20mm anti-tank rifle (S-18/100)
 44M kézi páncéltörő vető (Hungarian panzerschreck variant)
 Panzerfaust
 Panzerschreck
 Nagy Páncélököl (Panzerfaust 30)
 Kis Páncélököl (Panzerfaust Klein)

India

Sidearms

 Browning Hi-Power
 Colt M1911
 FN Model 1910
 Webley Revolver

Submachine guns

 Sten
 M1 Thompson

Shotguns

 Winchester Model 1897

Rifles

 Lee-Enfield (Standard issue rifle)
 Lee-Metford
 Pattern 1914 Enfield

Machine guns

 Bren light machine gun
 Lewis gun
 Maxim gun
 Madsen machine gun
 Vickers machine gun

Grenades

 Mills bomb

Iran

Sidearms

 Browning 1910
 Mauser C96
 Modèle 1892 revolver
 Walther P38

Submachine guns

 MP 34

Rifles

 Iranian Mauser M1900 (Standard issue rifle)
 Karabiner 98k
 vz. 24

Machine guns

 Lewis gun
 Maxim gun
 MG 34
 Vickers machine gun
 ZB vz.26

Iraq

Sidearms

 Beretta M1934
 Luger P08
 Mauser C96
 Webley Revolver

Submachine guns

 Beretta Model 38 (Model 38/44)

Rifles

 Karabiner 98k
 Lee-Enfield

Machine guns

 Chauchat
 Lewis gun
 Maxim gun
 Vickers machine gun

Italy

Edged weapons

 M1891 sciabola baionetta (Sword bayonet)
 M1891/38 pugnale baionetta (Dagger bayonet)
 M1939 pugnale (Dagger)

Sidearms

 Beretta M1923
 Beretta M1934
 Beretta M1935
 Beretta M418
 Bodeo M1889
 Glisenti M1910
 Ruby M1914
 Roth–Steyr M1907
 Steyr M1912
 Mauser C96
 Walther P38

Submachine guns

 Thompson M1A1 (Captured examples used by the Italian Army prior to 8 September 1943)
 Beretta M1918
 Beretta M1938
 FNAB-43
 TZ-45
 Villar-Perosa OVP M1918
 MP 40

Rifles

 Carcano M1891, M1938 and M1941
 Armaguerra Mod. 39 rifle
 Breda PG
 Revelli M1939
 Steyr-Mannlicher M1895
 Mauser Karabiner 98k

Light machine guns

 Breda Mod. 5C
 Breda M1930 
 MAC M1924/29 light machine gun

Medium machine guns

 Vickers machine gun (Chambered in 6.5×52mm Carcano)
 Breda Mod. 5G
 Breda M1937
 Breda M1938
 Fiat–Revelli M1914
 Fiat–Revelli M1935

Heavy machine guns

 Breda M1931

Grenades

 Breda M1935
 Breda M1942
 OTO L
 OTO M1935
 OTO M1942
 Passaglia grenade
 SRCM M1935

Flamethrowers

 Lanciafiamme M1935
 Lanciafiamme M1941
 Lanciafiamme M1941 D'assalto

Mortars

 Brixia 45/5 M1935
 CEMSA 81/14 M1935

Anti-tank weapons

 Boys anti-tank rifle (Captured in the North African campaign)
 Kb ppanc wz.35 (Ex-Polish)
 Solothurn S-18/100
 Solothurn S-18/1000
 Solothurn S-18/1100
 Panzerschreck
 Panzerfaust 30

Japan

See also: List of Japanese millitary equitment of World War II

Edged weapons

 Type 2 bayonet
 Type 30 bayonet
 Type 42 bayonet
 Guntō sword

Sidearms

 Browning FN M1910
 Colt M1903 Pocket Hammerless
 Smith & Wesson Model 3
 Astra 900
 Hamada Type pistol
 Hino–Komuro pistol
 Nambu Type 14
 North China Type 19 pistol
 Nambu Type 94
 Sugiura pistol
 Inagaki pistol
 Type 26 revolver
 Luger P08
 Mauser C96

Submachine guns

 Beretta M1938
 Nambu Type 100
 Type 2 submachine gun
 Tokyo Arsenal Model 1927
 MP 18
 MP 34

Semi-automatic rifles

 Pedersen rifle (Used in the Battle of Okinawa. Purchased during the 30s)
 Type Kō rifle
 Arisaka Type 5 rifle (Also known as the Type 4 Rifle)
 ZH-29 (285 rifles captured during Japanese invasion of Manchuria)
 Type Hei rifle (During World War II, the small numbers of Type Hei rifles that were available were pressed into service and some were captured by US troops in the Pacific Theater)
 Type Otsu

Rifles

 Arisaka Type I rifle
 Arisaka Type 30 rifle
 Arisaka Type 35 rifle
 Arisaka Type 38 rifle
 Arisaka Type 38 carbine
 Arisaka Type 44 carbine
 Arisaka Type 97 sniper rifle
 Arisaka Type 99 rifle
 Arisaka Type 99 sniper rifle
 Murata Type 22 rifle
 TERA Type 1, Type 2 and Type 100

Machine guns

 Type 92 machine gun (Copy of the Lewis machine gun)
 Browning M1918 (Captured from Chinese forces)
 Type 1 heavy machine gun
 Type 3 heavy machine gun
 Type 11 light machine gun
 Type 89 machine gun
 Type 92 heavy machine gun
 Type 96 light machine gun
 Type 97 heavy tank machine gun
 Type 98 machine gun
 Type 99 light machine gun

Grenades

 Type 4 grenade
 Type 10 fragmentation discharger/hand grenade
 Type 91 fragmentation discharger/hand grenade
 Type 97 fragmentation hand grenade
 Type 98 grenade
 Type 99 rifle/hand fragmentation grenade
 M1924 Stielhandgranate

Grenade dischargers

 Type 10
 Type 89

Mines

 Lunge anti-tank mine (Suicide mine on a stick)
 Type 99 anti-tank mine

Flamethrowers

 Type 93 and Type 100

Mortars

 Type 2 12 cm mortar
 Type 11 70 mm infantry mortar
 Type 90 light mortar
 Type 94 90 mm infantry mortar
 Type 96 150 mm infantry mortar
 Type 97 81 mm infantry mortar
 Type 97 90 mm infantry mortar
 Type 97 150 mm infantry mortar
 Type 98 50 mm mortar
 Type 99 81 mm mortar

Anti-tank weapons

 Type 4 70 mm AT Rocket Launcher
 Type 97 20 mm anti-tank rifle

Guided explosive weapons

 I-Go (Remote-controlled explosive machine)

Latvia

Sidearms

 Nagant M1895
 Luger P08

Submachine guns

 Tallinn Arsenal submachine gun

Rifles

 Lee–Enfield No.4 Mk I
 Ross rifle
 Mosin-Nagant M1891/30
 vz. 24

Machine guns

 Lewis machine gun
 Vickers machine gun

Grenades

 M1924 Stielhandgranate

Lithuania

Sidearms

 Colt M1911
 Ruby M1914
 Nagant M1895
 Luger P08
 Mauser C96

Submachine guns

 MP 18
 MP 34

Rifles

 Enfield Pattern P1914
 Mosin–Nagant rifle
 GRC Gewehr 88
 Mauser 24L
 Mauser Gewehr 98

Machine guns

 PM M1910
 Madsen machine gun
 ZB vz.26
 MG 08
 MG 08/15
 MG 34

Luxembourg

Sidearms

 Browning Hi-Power
 Webley revolver

Submachine guns

 MP 18

Rifles

 Enfield Pattern P1914
 Lee–Enfield rifle
 Ross rifle
 Mauser Gewehr 98
 Mauser Karabiner 98k
 Swedish Mauser M96

Machine guns

 Browning M1918
 Bren machine gun
 Vickers machine gun
 MG 08

Anti-tank weapons

 Boys anti-tank rifle

Manchukuo

Sidearms

 Astra Model 900
 FN M1900
 FN M1910
 Luger P08
 Nambu pistol
 Mauser C96
 Type 26 revolver
 Type 94 Nambu pistol

Submachine guns

 Erma EMP-35
 MP 18

Rifles

 Arisaka Type 30
 Arisaka Type 38 rifle
 Arisaka Type 99 rifle
 Type 44 carbine
 Hanyang Type 88
 Mauser Karabiner 98k

Machine guns

 Nambu Type 3 heavy machine gun
 Nambu Type 11 light machine gun
 Nambu Type 92 heavy machine gun
 Nambu Type 96 light machine gun
 ZB-30

Grenade dischargers

 Type 10 grenade discharger

Mengjiang

Sidearms

 Nambu pistol
 Type 26 revolver
 Luger P08
 Mauser C96

Submachine guns

 MP 18

Rifles

 Arisaka Type 30
 Arisaka Type 38
 Arisaka Type 99
 Hanyang 88

Machine guns

 Lewis gun
 Type 11 light machine gun
 Type 92 heavy machine gun
 ZB vz. 26

Mexico

Sidearms

 Colt M1911
 Smith & Wesson Military & Police
 Obregón pistol

Submachine guns

 M3 submachine gun
 Thompson M1A1
 Erma EMP-35

Rifles

 Winchester M1895
 Mondragon rifle
 vz. 24
 M1 Garand
 M1A1 Carbine
 Mauser Gewehr 98
 Mauser M1895, M1902 and M1936

Machine guns

 Lewis machine gun
 Browning M1919
 Hotchkiss M1914
 Vickers machine gun
 Mendoza C-1934
 Madsen machine gun

Anti-tank weapons

 M9 bazooka

Mongolia

Sidearms

 Nagant M1895
 Tokarev TT-33

Submachine guns

 PPSh-41
 PPS-43

Rifles

 Mosin–Nagant rifle

Machine guns

 Maxim M1910
 DShK machine gun
 Goryunov SG-43
 Degtyaryov machine gun

Montenegro

Sidearms

 Beretta Model 1915
 Beretta M1934
 Bodeo Model 1889
 M1891
 M1910/22

Submachine guns

 Beretta Model 38

Rifles

 Berthier rifle 
 Carcano 
 Lebel Model 1886 rifle 
 M1924

Machine guns

 Breda 30
 Fiat–Revelli Modello 1914
 Lewis gun
 Hotchkiss M1914
 M26
 M37

Nepal

Sidearms

 Webley Revolver

Submachine guns

 Sten

Rifles

 Lee-Enfield

Machine guns

 Lewis gun
 Bren light machine gun
 Vickers machine gun

Netherlands

Sidearms

 Browning Hi-Power
 Browning FN M1903
 Browning FN M1910/22
 Borchardt-Luger pistol
 Mauser C96 (Used by the KNIL)

Submachine guns

 Thompson M1928 (Used by the Royal Netherlands East Indies Army and [KNIL])
 Sten submachine gun (Used by the KNIL)
 Owen submachine gun (Used by the KNIL)
 MP 28 (Used by the KNIL)

Rifles

 M1 Carbine
 Johnson M1941 rifle (Used by the KNIL)
 Lee–Enfield rifle
 Dutch Mannlicher M1895
 vz. 24

Machine guns

 Lewis machine gun
 Browning M1918 (Used by the KNIL)
 Bren machine gun
 Vickers machine gun
 Madsen machine gun (Used by the KNIL in the carbine version)
 Schwarzlose M1907/12
 MG 08

Grenades

 Mk.2 fragmentation hand grenade (Used by the KNIL)

Anti-tank weapons

 M1 Bazooka
 PIAT
 Solothurn S-18/1100 (Used by the KNIL)
 Bofors 37 mm

New Zealand

Sidearms

 Browning Hi-Power
 Enfield No.2
 Smith & Wesson Military & Police
 Webley revolver
 Luger P08

Submachine guns

 Thompson submachine gun
 Sten submachine gun
 Owen submachine gun

Rifles

 Lee–Enfield rifle (Standard issue rifle)
 Charlton M1942 automatic rifle

Machine guns

 Lewis machine gun
 Bren machine gun
 Vickers machine gun

Grenades

 No.36M grenade (Also known as the "Mills bomb")

Anti-tank weapons

 PIAT
 Boys anti-tank rifle

Norway

Sidearms

 Colt Kongsberg M1914 (Licensed copy of the Colt M1911, standard issue for the Norwegian Army until 1940)
 Webley revolver (Used by the Norwegian Resistance)
 Nagant M1893 (Earlier service revolver that preceded the Colt Kongsberg M1914 in service and was still in use by 1940)

Submachine guns

 M3 submachine gun (Used by the Norwegian Resistance)
 Sten submachine gun (Used by the Norwegian Resistance)

Rifles

 M1 Carbine (Norwegian Resistance)
 Lee–Enfield rifle (Norwegian Resistance)
 Krag-Jørgensen M1894 (Standard service rifle of the Norwegian forces until 1940, carbines and sniper versions were also used)
 Mauser Karabiner 98k (Norwegian Resistance)
 Swedish Mauser M96 (Used by the police troops trained in neutral Sweden)
 Automatgevär M42 (Used by the police troops trained in neutral Sweden)

Machine guns

 Colt M29 (Standard heavy machine gun and anti-aircraft defense)
 Hotchkiss M1898 (Had been replaced by the Colt M29 by 1940, but was still part of the armament of several fortifications)
 Bren machine gun (Norwegian Resistance)
 Madsen M14 and M22 (Standard light machine gun)

Philippines

Edged weapons

 Bolo knife 
 Gunong 
 Kalis

Sidearms

 Colt M1911 
 M1917 revolver 
 Nambu pistol (Captured)
 Type 26 revolver(Captured)

Submachine guns

 Thompson submachine gun
 United Defense M42

Shotguns

 Browning Auto-5 
 Winchester M1897 
 Winchester M1912

Rifles

 Arisaka Type 30 (Captured)
 Arisaka Type 38 (Captured)
 Arisaka Type 99 (Captured)
 M1 Garand 
 Springfield M1903

Machine guns

 Browning M1918 
 Browning M1919A4
 Browning M2 
 Type 3 heavy machine gun(Captured)
 Type 11 light machine gun(Captured)
 Type 92 heavy machine gun(Captured)
 Type 99 light machine gun(Captured)

Grenades

 Mk2 grenade

Grenade launchers

 Bazooka

Flamethrowers

 M2 flamethrower

Mortars

 M1 mortar

Poland

Sidearms

 Browning Hi-Power
 Colt M1911 (Used by the Polish Armed Forces in the West)
 Ruby M1914
 Nagant M1895
 Nagant wz.1932
 Radom Pistolet wz.35 Vis (Standard service sidearm in 1939)
 Tokarev TT-33 (Used by the Polish Armed Forces in the East)

Submachine gun

 Mors wz. 39 (Prototype only. Prototypes issued to the 3rd Rifle Battalion and the 39th Infantry Division)
 Thompson submachine gun (Used by the Polish Armed Forces in the West)
 Sten submachine gun (Used by the Polish Armed Forces in the West)
 Bechowiec 1 (Used by the resistance movement)
 Błyskawica submachine gun (Used by the resistance movement)
 Choroszmanów submachine gun (Used by the resistance movement)
 PPS submachine gun (Used by the Polish Armed Forces in the East)
 PPSh-41 (Used by the Polish Armed Forces in the East)

Rifles

 Karabin wz.98a (Main service rifle in 1939)
 Karabinek wz.29 (Main service rifle in 1939, based on the Karabin wz.98a)
 Karabinek wz. 91/98/23 (Based on Mosin–Nagant rifle, used in the Invasion of Poland)
 Karabinek wz. 91/98/25
 Karabinek wz. 91/98/26
 Kbsp wz. 1938M (Small number produced)
 Lee–Enfield rifle (Used by the Polish Armed Forces in the West)
 Berthier rifle (Used by second-line troops in 1939)
 Lebel M1886/93 (Used by second-line troops in 1939)
 Mosin–Nagant rifle (Used by the Polish Armed Forces in the East)
 SVT-40 (Used by the Polish Armed Forces in the East)
 Mauser Gewehr 98 (Used by the resistance movement)
 Mauser Karabiner 98k (Used by the resistance movement)

Machine guns

 Lewis machine gun
 Maxim wz. 1910 (Used by the Polish Armed Forces in the East)
 Browning M1917
 Ckm wz.30 (Polish standard heavy machine gun variant of the Browning M1917)
 Browning M1918
 Ckm wz.32 (Polish variant of the Browning M1919 chambered in 7.92mm)
 Browning wz.1928 (Standard light machine gun)
 Bren machine gun (Used by the Polish Armed Forces in the West)
 Type C machine gun
 Degtyaryov machine gun (Used by the Polish Armed Forces in the East)

Grenades

 Molotov fire grenade
 wz.1933 fragmentation grenade
 wz.1933 concussion grenade
 wz.S smoke grenade

Grenade launchers

 Granatnik wz.36

Flamethrowers

 Sender flamethrower
 WS-1 flamethrower
 WS-2 flamethrower
 Zieliński flamethrower

Mortars

 wz.18 mortar
 wz.18/31 mortar
 wz.28 mortar
 wz.31 mortar
 wz.32 heavy mortar
 wz.40 mortar

Anti-tank weapons

 PIAT (Used by the Polish Armed Forces in the West)
 Kb ppanc wz.35
 Panzerfaust (Used by the resistance movement)
 wz.36 (Polish Bofors 37mm)

Romania

Sidearms

 Beretta M1934
 Beretta M1935
 Ruby M1914
 Nagant M1895
 Steyr M1912
 Tokarev TT-33 (Captured)

Submachine guns

 Orita M1941
 Beretta M1938
 MP 28
 MP 40
 MP 41
 PPSh-41 (Captured)

Rifles

 vz.24 (Standard infantry rifle, adopted in 1938)
 Mannlicher M1893 (also known as the M93)
 Carcano rifle (supplied by Italy) 
 Lebel M1886/93 (Issued to second-line troops)
 Mosin–Nagant rifle (Captured)

Machine guns

 Lewis machine gun
 PM M1910 (Captured)
 ZB vz. 26
 ZB-30
 ZB-53
 MG 34

Anti-tank weapons

 Panzerschreck
 Panzerfaust
 Bofors 37 mm

Slovak Republic

Sidearms

 Pistole vz. 22
 Pistole vz. 24
 Luger P08

Rifles

 ZB vz. 24
 Mauser Karabiner 98k

Submachine guns

 ZK-383
 MP 40

Light machine guns

 ZB vz. 26
 ZB vz. 30
 MG 34

Heavy machine guns

 Schwarzlose M1907/12 (As Kulomet vz. 24)

Mortars

 80 mm vz. 36 medium mortar

South Africa

Sidearms

 Webley revolver

Submachine guns

 Thompson M1928
 Sten submachine gun

Rifles

 Lee–Enfield No.1 Mk III* and No.4 Mk I
 Lee–Enfield No.5 Mk I "Jungle carbine"
 Rieder M1941 automatic rifle

Machine guns

 Bren machine gun
 Vickers machine gun

Mortars

 Ordnance SBML 2-inch mortar

Anti-tank weapons

 M1 Bazooka (Also known as 3.5-inch rocket launcher)
 PIAT

Soviet Union

Edged weapons

 NR-40 knife
 AVS-36 bayonet
 Mosin-Nagant 1891 bayonet
 S84/98 III bayonet (Captured)

Sidearms

 Colt M1911A1 (American Lend-Lease)
 Nagant M1895
 Mauser C96 (Captured)
 Korovin TK
 Tokarev TT-33

Submachine guns

 Reising M50 (American Lend-Lease)
 Thompson submachine gun (American Lend-Lease)
 MP 40 (Captured)
 PPD-34/38
 PPD-40
 PPSh-41
 PPS-42
 PPS-43

Automatic and battle rifles

 AVS-36
 AVT-40
 Fedorov M1916 Avtomat

Rifles

 M1 Carbine (American Lend-Lease)
 Mosin–Nagant M1891/30 rifle
 Mosin–Nagant M1938 carbine
 Mosin–Nagant M1944 carbine
 Mauser Karabiner 98k (Captured from the Germans)
 SKS carbine (Limited use in 1945)
 Tokarev SVT-38 and SVT-40
 Winchester M1895

Machine guns

 Lewis machine gun (Lend-Lease)
 Maxim M1910
 Degtyaryov DP-27 (Erroneously called DP-28 in the west)
 Degtyaryov DS-39 (Production discontinued after the German invasion)
 Degtyaryov DTM-4
 Degtyaryov RPD (Limited use in 1945)
 DShK machine gun
 Goryunov SG-43

Grenades

 M1924 Stielhandgranate (Captured from the Germans)
 Molotov fire grenade
 F1 grenade
 Rdultovsky M1914 and M1917
 RG-41
 RG-42
 RGD-33
 RPG-6
 RPG-40
 RPG-43

Grenade launchers

 Dyakonoff grenade launcher (Attachment on the M91/30 rifle only)

Mines

 TM-35 mine (Anti-tank mine)

Flamethrowers

 ROKS-2
 ROKS-3

Anti-tank weapons

 M1 Bazooka (American Lend-Lease)
 PIAT (British Lend-Lease)
 Boys anti-tank rifle (British Lend-Lease)
 Panzerschreck (Captured)
 Panzerfaust 60 (Captured)
 Bofors 37 mm
 PTRD-41
 PTRS-41

Thailand

Sidearms

 Astra 300
 Browning FN M1900
 Colt M1911
 Nambu Type 14
 Type 78 Luger pistol
 Type 79 Colt Super
 Type 80 Star
 Type 82 Colt revolver

Submachine guns

 MP 18
 Nambu Type 100
 Type 80 machine pistol

Rifles

 Siamese Types 46, 46/66, 47, 47/66 and 66 Mauser rifle (Standard issue rifle)
 Type 83 Arisaka rifle (Japanese type 38 rifle in Thai service. Supplied by Japan)
 Type 83 Arisaka carbine
 Lee Enfield Mk III "Wild Tiger" rifle (Used by Royal Thai Police. Adopted in 1919, as issue rifle for the Wild Tiger Corps.)

Machine guns

 Type 66 Browning M1917
 Type 66 Madsen machine gun
 Type 92 heavy machine gun
 Vickers machine gun

Grenades

 Type 91 grenade
 Type 78 grenade

Grenade dischargers

 Type 10 grenade discharger

Anti-tank weapons

 Type 97 automatic cannon

United Kingdom (including colonies)

Edged weapons

 BC-41 dagger
 Fairbairn–Sykes fighting knife
 Kris dagger (British Malaya)
 Kukri machete (Used by Gurkha regiments)
 Parang knife (British Malaya)
 Smatchet knife sword

Sidearms

 Webley Mk.IV (.38/200) and Mk.VI (.455)
 Webley Self-Loading Pistol
 Enfield No.2
 M1917 revolver (Issued to the Home Guard)
 FN/Inglis Browning Hi-Power (As Pistol No.2 Mk.I)
 Colt M1911
 Colt M1927 Official Police
 Smith & Wesson Military & Police
 Welrod pistol (Used by commandos)
 Nambu Type 14 (British Malaya)
 Luger P-08 (British Malaya)

Submachine guns

 Thompson M1928, M1928A1 and M1A1
 Sten submachine gun (About 4 million produced from all sources)
 Sterling submachine gun 
 Lanchester submachine gun (Copy of the German MP 28/II, used by the Royal Navy and RAF)

Shotguns

 Browning Auto-5
 Remington M1911
 Winchester M1897
 Winchester M1912

Rifles

 Lee–Enfield No.1 Mk III and No.4 Mk I (Standard issue rifle)
 Lee–Enfield No.5 Mk I "Jungle carbine"
 Enfield Pattern P1914
 M1 Carbine
 M1 Garand (Received 38,000 as Lend-Lease)
 Enfield M1917 (Used by Home Guard)
 Remington Model 8 (Used by the Home Guard)
 Ross rifle (Supplied by Canada. Used by the Home Guard)
 Martini–Enfield rifle (Used by the Home Guard)
 De Lisle carbine (Used by Commandos)
 Howell M1915 automatic rifle (Used by Home Guard)
 Arisaka Type 38 (British Malaya)
 Arisaka Type 99 (British Malaya)

Sniper rifles

 Enfield Pattern P1914
 Lee–Enfield No.4 Mk I (T)

Machine guns

 Bren machine gun
 Lewis machine gun
 Browning M1917 (Used by the Home Guard)
 Browning M1919
 Browning M2
 Colt–Browning M1895 (Used by the Home Guard)
 Vickers K machine gun
 Vickers machine gun
 Vickers-Berthier machine gun (Indian Army use)
 Besa machine gun

Grenades

 Mk.2 fragmentation hand grenade (British Malaya)
 No.36M Mk.I grenade (Fragmentation rifle, hand grenade, also known as the "Mills bomb")
 No.68 anti-tank grenade (HEAT anti-tank rifle grenade)
 No.69 Mk.I grenade (Concussion hand grenade)
 No.73 anti-tank grenade (Also known as the "Thermos grenade")
 No.74 anti-tank hand grenade (Also known as the "Sticky bomb")
 No.75 anti-tank hand grenade (Also known as the "Hawkins grenade")
 No.76 special incendiary grenade (Phosphorus hand grenade)
 No.77 grenade (White phosphorus hand grenade)
 No.82 hand grenade (Also known as the "Gammon bomb")
 Type 97 grenade (British Malaya)
 Molotov fire grenade (British Malaya)

Obstacle clearing explosive charges

 McClintock Bangalore torpedo

Flamethrowers

 Flamethrower, Portable, No 2 "Lifebuoy"

Mortars

 Ordnance SBML 2-inch mortar
 Ordnance ML 3-inch mortar

Anti-tank weapons

 M1 Bazooka
 Projector, Infantry, Anti-tank (PIAT)
 Boys anti-tank rifle
 Bofors 37 mm

Guided explosive weapons

 Metropolitan-Vickers Beetle (Cable-guided explosive machine)

United States

Blade weapons

 Ka-Bar knife
 M1 bayonet
 M3 fighting knife
 M4 bayonet
 M1905 bayonet
 M1917 bayonet
 M1942 bayonet
 Mark I trench knife
 United States Marine Raider stiletto
 Bowie knife

Sidearms

 Browning Hi-Power
 Colt M1892
 Colt M1903 Pocket Hammerless
 Colt M1909 New Service
 Colt M1911A1
 Colt M1917
 Colt M1927 Official Police (Also known as Colt M1927 Commando)
 Smith & Wesson Military & Police
 Smith & Wesson Model 27

Submachine guns
 M3A1 submachine gun
 Reising M50 
 Thompson M1A1
 United Defense M42
 M2 Hyde

Shotguns
Commonly used by the United States Marine Corps in the Pacific theater, limited use in Europe.

 Browning Auto-5
 Remington M1931
 Winchester M1897
 Winchester M1912 (Also used to the Western Front, standard-issue shotgun of the US Army)
 Winchester M1921
 Stevens M520-30 and M620
 Ithaca 37

Rifles

 M1 Carbine
 M1A1 Carbine (Paratrooper version of the M1 Carbine with folding stock)
 M1 Garand
 M2 Carbine (Small number used in Okinawa)
 Enfield M1917
 Springfield M1903A1
 Johnson M1941 rifle

Sniper rifles

 M1C Garand
 Enfield M1917
 Springfield M1903A1 and A4 (Used by the Marine Corps)
 Winchester Model 70

Recoilless rifles

 M18 recoilless rifle (Uncommon in Europe, some use in the Pacific)

Machine guns

 Browning M1917A1 heavy machine gun
 Browning M1918A2 light machine gun
 Browning M1919A4 medium machine gun and M1919A6 general purpose machine gun
 Browning M2HB heavy machine gun
 Browning M1919 Stinger machine gun (A modified M1919 aircraft variant used by USMC with a BAR M1918 bipod, an M1 Garand stock, a modified trigger and an M1919 body, a few were built but saw limited action and most didn't survive to this day.)
 Johnson M1941 machine gun

Grenades

 Mk.2 fragmentation hand grenade

Grenade launchers

 M7 grenade launcher (M1 Garand attachment)

Obstacle clearing explosive charges

 M1A1 Bangalore torpedo

Flamethrowers
 M1 flamethrower
 M1A1 flamethrower
 M2 flamethrower

Mortars

 M1 mortar
 M2 mortar
 M2 4.2-inch mortar

Anti-tank weapons

 M1A1 and M9 Bazooka rocket launcher
 M18 recoilless rifle (Uncommon in Europe, some use in the Pacific)

Yugoslavia

Sidearms

 Browning Hi-Power (British aid)
 M1891
 M1910/22
 Ruby pistol
 Luger P08 (Captured)
 Mauser C96
 Walther P38 (Captured)
 Tokarev TT-33 (Soviet aid)

Submachine guns
 Thompson submachine gun (American aid)
 United Defense M42 (American aid)
 Sten submachine gun (British aid)
 Beretta M1938 (Captured)
 Suomi KP/-31 (Captured)
 Danuvia 43M (Captured)
 ZK-383 (Captured)
 Erma EMP-35
 MP 34 (Captured)
 MP 40 (Captured)
 PPSh-41 (Soviet aid)
 PPS-43 (Soviet aid)
 PPD-40 (Soviet aid)

Automatic rifles

 Sturmgewehr 44 (Captured)

Rifles

 Mauser-Koka
 Berthier rifle
 M1 Carbine (American aid)
 Lee–Enfield rifle (British aid)
 Lebel Model 1886 rifle 
 Carcano rifle (Captured)
 M1899
 M1910
 M1924
 Kbk wz. 1929
 Steyr-Mannlicher M1895
 vz. 24
 Gewehr 41 (Captured)
 Gewehr 43 (Captured)
 Mauser Gewehr 98 (Captured)
 Mauser Karabiner 98k (Captured)

Machine guns

 Lewis machine gun
 M26
 M37
 M1909
 Browning M1918 (American aid)
 Hotchkiss M1914
 Bren machine gun (British aid)
 Breda M1930 (Captured)
 Breda M1937 (Captured)
 Fiat–Revelli M1914
 Chauchat M1915
 Madsen machine gun
 PM M1910
 Schwarzlose machine gun
 MG 34 (Captured)
 MG 42 (Captured)

Grenades

 Vasić M12
 M1924 Stielhandgranate (Captured)
 M1939 Eierhandgranate (Captured)

Flamethrowers

 Abwehrflammenwerfer 42 (Captured)
 Schilt portable flamethrower

Anti-tank weapons

 M1 Bazooka (American aid)
 PIAT (British aid)
 Boys anti-tank rifle (British aid)
 Panzerfaust (Captured)
 Panzerschreck (Captured)
 M1933 anti-tank rifle

World War II weapons list shown by categories

See also

 German designations of foreign artillery in World War II
 German designations of foreign firearms in World War II
 List of World War II firearms of Germany
 List of World War II weapons
 Lists of World War II military equipment
 Specifications for World War II infantry weapons
 List of secondary and special-issue World War II infantry weapons
 List of prototype World War II infantry weapons

References

Bibliography

 David Miller. (2003). "The illustrated directory of 20th-century guns". Minneapolis, Minnesota: Zenith Imprint. .
 James H. Willbanks. (2004). "Machine guns: An illustrated history of their impact". Santa Barbara, California: ABC-CLIO. .
 Jeff Kinard. (2004). "Pistols: An illustrated history of their impact". Santa Barbara, California: ABC-CLIO. .
 John Walterll. (2006)."The rifle story: An illustrated history from 1756 to the present day". Norwalk, Connecticut: MBI Publishing company. .
 Robert W.D. Ball. (2011). "Mauser military rifles of the world". Iola, Wisconsin: New York City, New York: F+W Media, Inc. .
 Wayne Zwoll. (2003). "Bolt action rifles". Iola, Wisconsin: Krause publications. .

Infantry weapons World War II
Infantry weapons
Infantry, World War II